Marco Biagianti (born 19 April 1984) is an Italian footballer , with a midfielder role.  After previously playing for Catania from 2006 to 2013 and having captained the club from 9 July 2011 to 2013, he moved to Livorno in 2013 where he remained until 2016. From 2016 to 2020 she returned to Catania.  The 2020-2021 season, after being taken out of the squad through a press conference, announces the farewell to professional football and a new adventure begins with the 5-a-side football goal Catania.  In the year 2021-22 he holds the position of club manager of the Catania goal.  From August 2022 he becomes team manager of Catania SSD.

Club career

A.C.F. Fiorentina
Biagianti began his career with former Serie A giants ACF Fiorentina, in 2002, during the club's financial troubles that led to their relegation to the Serie C2. After spending his early career with the club's youth system, the central midfielder was promoted to the first team for the 2003–2004 season, but was instantly loaned out to Serie C2 side Fano Calcio. During his first full season as a professional footballer, Biagianti managed 30 first team appearances, and returned to Florence for the start of the 2004–2005 season. However, Fiorentina again opted to loan the youngster out, and he joined A.S.D. Chieti, who were playing in the Serie C1 at the time. In his lone season with Chieti, Biagianti made 26 league appearances and scored a single goal. It was his first professional goal. Following his return to Tuscany, after the second loan deal expired, Biagianti was surprisingly sold to another third division club, in the form of F.C. Pro Vasto.

Pro Vasto
In August 2005, Biagianti officially transferred to F.C. Pro Vasto of the Italian Serie C1. He made a total of 31 league starts, and scored 1 league goal, but it was not enough to save his club from relegation to the Serie C2. He started the new season as a regular starter and racked up 15 appearances in all competitions, before transferring to Serie A club, Calcio Catania in January 2006.

Calcio Catania
Biagianti was scouted by Catania chief, Pierto Lo Monaco in 2005, and negotiations began in December 2005, and led to his January transfer to the Sicilian club. In his first half-season with Catania, Biagianti made just 2 league appearances, but in his second season, became a more integral part of the team. He appeared in over 20 matches in all competitions, during the 2007–2008 season, and earned a guaranteed starting place for the 2008–2009 season, under then-coach Walter Zenga. Biagianti made 34 Serie A appearances alone, and helped Catania to safely avoid relegation concerns. Biagianti maintained his status as a starter during the 2009–10 Serie A campaign and went on to make 36 league appearances, appearing more than any other player in the first team. He also managed to score 3 league goals, helping lead Catania to a 12th place league finish, a record high points total for the club in Serie A and to a quarter final position in the Coppa Italia.

Since joining Calcio Catania he has been one of their most influential players. Because of his superb performances, Biagianti has been linked with moves to Serie A giants A.C. Milan, Juventus, Fiorentina, and A.S. Roma, but despite these rumours Biagianti has reiterated his desire to remain in Sicily. Biagianti, unfortunately missed much of the Serie A 2010-11 campaign due to injury, and made just 13 appearances, his fewest in a season with the Sicilians since his first at the club. The club did however reach a record points total in a Serie A season for a third consecutive season.

On 9 July 2011, Biagianti was assigned captaincy at the club. However, the midfielder missed much of the 2011–12 Serie A season through injury, although his club continued their league surge, by breaking the club's record points total in the top flight for a fourth consecutive season, finishing 11th. He is currently part of a record-breaking Catania outfit that had picked up 56 points from 38 Serie A matches. This performance saw the club also break its record number of home victories in a single season, its record number of victories overall in a single top flight campaign, as well as its record points total in Serie A for the fifth consecutive season.

International career
On 29 May 2009, Biagianti received his first call up to the Italy national football team as he was named in the squad for the friendly against Northern Ireland that took place on 6 June 2009. Also named in the squad was teammate Giuseppe Mascara. Biagianti remained on the bench for that game, however. Biagianti was linked with a possible place in Marcello Lippi's squad for the 2010 FIFA World Cup, but eventually failed to make the 23-man roster chosen by Lippi.

External links
Gazzetta Dello Sports player profile
 Marco Biagianti Fan Club
 Soccer News, Live Scores, Results & Transfers | Goal.com US
 TRANSFER market WEB - football - soccer transfer news and rumors

Living people
1984 births
Footballers from Florence
Association football midfielders
Italian footballers
ACF Fiorentina players
Alma Juventus Fano 1906 players
S.S. Chieti Calcio players
Vastese Calcio 1902 players
Catania S.S.D. players
U.S. Livorno 1915 players
Serie A players
Serie B players
Serie C players